This article provides a collection of opinion polls that were conducted relating to the 2009 Israeli legislative election.

Notes
 Israeli law requires a 2% threshold (yielding a minimum of two seats) for a party to be seated in the Knesset. Therefore, surveys that poll only one seat for a party reveal limited support that would not actually result in their seating.
 Where contradictions in sources are found, the table lists the result from the original source, where available, or the majority of other sources. These are noted and referenced below.
 The three main Arab parties (United Arab List-Ta'al, Hadash, and Balad) are grouped together when no source reveals how they were polled separately. On December 22, 2008, the Israeli Elections Committee delivered a court order mandating that media list these parties by name.
 In December 2008, the National Union was reconstituted as a separate party from The Jewish Home. Prior to then, surveys polled these groups collectively.

Polling

References

Israel
Opinion polling in Israel